The Ville Formation is a geologic formation in Germany. It preserves fossils dating back to the Neogene period. Lignite of the Ville Formation is excavated in North Rhine-Westphalia.

Description
The Middle Miocene Hambach 6C site located within the Ville Formation is believed to have been deposited in an estuarine setting in a large fluviatile system with extended coal swamps surrounding it, as supported by sedimentological and palaeobotanical evidence. Many tetrapod remains found in the Ville Formation are associated with tropical elements such as primates, chameleons and carettochelyine turtles, suggesting the age of the fauna to be at approximately 15.5 Ma during the Middle Miocene Climate Transition. The paleoflora of the formation also supports a tropical-like climate at the time of deposition.

The younger late Pliocene (approximately 2.5 Ma) sites of Hambach 11 & 13 are believed to be deposited in oxygenated water and currents in a river channel setting in close vicinity to lakes or oxbows, as supported by sedimentological and palaeobotanical evidence

Fossil content

Mammals

Rodents

Ungulates

Reptiles

Squamates

Testudines

Amphibians

See also

 List of fossiliferous stratigraphic units in Germany

References

 

Neogene Germany